This is a list of results for the Legislative Council at the 2022 South Australian state election.

The 11 of 22 seats up for election were 5 Liberal, 4 Labor, 1 Green, 1 Advance SA and 1 Dignity. The outcome was 5 Labor, 4 Liberal, 1 Green and 1 One Nation. Carrying over from the 2018 election were 4 Labor, 4 Liberal, 1 Green, 2 SA-BEST.

Election results

See also
 Candidates of the 2022 South Australian state election
 Members of the South Australian Legislative Council, 2022–2026

References

2022
2022 elections in Australia
2020s in South Australia